Mark Ormerod may refer to:

 Mark Ormerod (footballer) (born 1976), English footballer
 Mark Ormerod (civil servant) (born 1957), British civil servant

See also
 Mark Ormrod (disambiguation)